Robert Hoffmann (30 August 1939 – 4 July 2022) was an Austrian actor, best known to British audiences for his title role performance in The Adventures of Robinson Crusoe (1964).

Hoffmann was born in Salzburg. Crusoe was his screen debut, but he later worked in film (including a number of giallo horror-thrillers) and TV throughout Europe, in Germany, Italy, France the UK, and appeared in films by directors such as Marcel Carné, Antonio Pietrangeli, Robert Siodmak,  and Robert Enrico.

In 1997, he was interviewed by the BBC for TV and radio when the Robinson Crusoe series was first released on video.

Selected filmography
 The Adventures of Robinson Crusoe (1964, TV miniseries)
 Angélique, Marquise des Anges (1964)
 Marvelous Angelique (1965)
 Up from the Beach (1965)
 I Knew Her Well (1965)
 Three Rooms in Manhattan (1965)
 Neues vom Hexer (1965)
 The Gentlemen (1965)
 Wake Up and Die (1966)
 How I Learned to Love Women (1966)
 Grand Slam (1967)
  (1967)
 Assignment K (1968)
 24 Hours in the Life of a Woman (1968)
 Tevye and His Seven Daughters (1968)
 A Black Veil for Lisa (1968)
 The Last Roman (1968)
 Diary of a Telephone Operator (1969)
 Carnal Circuit (1969)
 Naked Girl Killed in the Park (1972)
 Death Carries a Cane (1973)
 Hubertus Castle (1973)
 Spasmo (1974)
 Le vieux fusil (1975)
  (1975)
 The Standard (1977)
 Eyes Behind the Stars (1978)
 The Sea Wolves (1980)
  (1984)
  (1998, TV film)

References

External links

1939 births
2022 deaths
Austrian male television actors
Austrian male film actors
20th-century Austrian male actors
Actors from Salzburg